Qoʻshrabot is an urban-type settlement in Samarqand Region, Uzbekistan. It is the capital of Qoʻshrabot District. Its population was 1,999 people in 1989, and 8,500 in 2016.

References

Populated places in Samarqand Region
Urban-type settlements in Uzbekistan